A Million Miles Away is the second installment in The Emo Diaries series of compilation albums, released April 14, 1998, by Deep Elm Records. As with all installments in the series, the label had an open submissions policy for bands to submit material for the compilation, and as a result the music does not all fit within the emo style. As with the rest of the series, A Million Miles Away features mostly unsigned bands contributing songs that were previously unreleased.

Track listing

References

External links 
 A Million Miles Away at Deep Elm Records.

1998 compilation albums
Deep Elm Records compilation albums
Emo compilation albums
Indie rock compilation albums